The Bagalini Bagalini is an Italian homebuilt ultralight aircraft that was designed by Marino Bagalini. The aircraft is supplied in the form of plans for amateur construction.

Design and development

The aircraft features a strut-braced parasol wing, a single-seat open cockpit without a windshield, fixed tricycle landing gear and a single engine in pusher configuration.

The Bagalini's fuselage is made from wood and metal, while the wings are a wooden frame covered in doped aircraft fabric. The rear fuselage consists of two tubes, one above and one below the pusher engine. Its  span wing employs a modified NACA 63-215 airfoil at the wing root transitioning to a NACA 4412 at the wing tips.

The manufacturer estimates the construction time from the supplied plans as 700 hours.

Specifications (Bagalini)

References

Bagalini
1990s Italian sport aircraft
1990s Italian ultralight aircraft
Single-engined pusher aircraft
Parasol-wing aircraft
Homebuilt aircraft